Deepwater Millennium was a fifth generation Samsung/Reading & Bates designed, dynamic positioned (DP) Marshall Islands-flagged drillship owned by Transocean. It was retired in 2018.

History
Built originally for R&B Falcon, she was completed in 1999 by Samsung Heavy Industries in Geoje, South Korea. In 2001 R&B Falcon merged with Transocean Sedco-Forex. She is the third of four Deepwater Pathfinder class ships.

After initial work in the Gulf of Mexico, Deepwater Millennium has drilled wells off West and East Africa and Brazil. With the exception of one well off Nova Scotia in the summer of 2002, she was in the Gulf continuously from 2001 to 2008. Her work includes wells for Kerr-McGee, Pioneer, Marathon Oil, Mariner, Chevron Corporation, Anadarko Petroleum, Statoil, and Petrobras. More recently she was drilling off the coast of Western Australia on an 18-month contract for Woodside Petroleum.

See also

References

External links
 Transocean official website
 trading/a/544/deepwater_millennium/ Deepwater Millennium at RigZone
  Deepwater Millennium – V7HD2 – latest reported position from Sailwx

Drillships
Transocean
Ships built by Samsung Heavy Industries
1999 ships